Elections to Penwith District Council were held on 10 June 2004.  The whole council was up for election with boundary changes since the last election in 2003 increasing the number of seats by one. The council stayed under no overall control and overall turnout was 46.9%

After the election, the composition of the council was
Liberal Democrat 14
Conservative 12
Independent 8
Labour 1

Results

By ward

References

2004 Penwith election result
Turnout figures
Ward results

2004 English local elections
2004
2000s in Cornwall